The Swiss Association of Scientific Zoos, or ZooSchweiz, is the zoological association responsible for the operation of zoos in Switzerland. ZooSchweiz is a member of  Verband der Zoologischen Gärten, which is in turn affiliate to WAZA. The association also use the name zoosuisse in French.

The mission of the association is to make a contribution to the biodiversity of the Earth, through the conservation of animal species and their habitats.

The association currently handles the management of nine institutions:
 Basel Zoo
 Tierpark Bern
 Nature and Animal Park Goldau 
 Knie's Kinderzoo
 La Garenne
  Papiliorama in Kerzers
 Zurich Zoo
 Wildnispark Zurich, Langenberg 
 Walter Zoo, Gossau

See also
 List of zoo associations

References 

Zoo associations